The following is a list of integrals (antiderivative functions) of logarithmic functions. For a complete list of integral functions, see list of integrals.

Note: x > 0 is assumed throughout this article, and the constant of integration is omitted for simplicity.

Integrals involving only logarithmic functions

 

 

 

 

 

 

 , the logarithmic integral.

Integrals involving logarithmic and power functions

 

 

 

 

 

 

 

 , etc.

Integrals involving logarithmic and trigonometric functions

Integrals involving logarithmic and exponential functions

n consecutive integrations

For  consecutive integrations, the formula

 

generalizes to

See also

References 

 Milton Abramowitz and Irene A. Stegun, Handbook of Mathematical Functions with Formulas, Graphs, and Mathematical Tables, 1964. A few integrals are listed on page 69.

Logarithmic functions